David G. Busey (1912-1981) was an American football coach and athletic director. He was the head coach at Lycoming College in Williamsport, Pennsylvania from 1954 to 1966, compiling a record of 41–56–3.

Upon his arrival at Lycoming, Busey was tasked with restarting a football program that had stopped playing in 1950. His first squad featured only two players with any football playing experience.

Head coaching record

References

External links
 Lycoming Hall of Fame profile

Lycoming Warriors athletic directors
Lycoming Warriors football coaches
University of Illinois Urbana-Champaign alumni
1912 births
1981 deaths